Dyberry may refer to:

Dyberry Creek, a tributary of the Lackawaxen River
Dyberry Township, Wayne County, Pennsylvania